Heathrow: Britain's Busiest Airport is a British documentary series, aired by ITV from 3 October 2015. Eight series have been produced, with the latest series starting on 20 July 2022.

Format
The series follows the events happening day after day at Heathrow Airport in London.

Episodes

Series overview

Series 1 (2015)

Series 2 (2016)

Official episode viewing figures are from BARB.

Series 3 (2017)

Official episode viewing figures are from BARB.

Series 4 (2018)
From series 4, episodes were cut down from 60 to 30 minutes to fit a new time slot.

Series 5 (2019)

Series 6 (2020) 
Series 6 was filmed before COVID-19 restrictions.

Series 7 (2021)
The first 3 episodes of this series were filmed in late 2020 during the COVID-19 pandemic and through England's second national lockdown. Episodes 4 and above were recorded during the relaxation of certain UK travel restrictions in mid 2021.

Series 8 (2022)

Series 8 premiered on 20 July 2022.

References

External links

2015 British television series debuts
2010s British documentary television series
2020s British documentary television series
2010s British reality television series
2020s British reality television series
Documentary television series about aviation
English-language television shows
Britain's Busiest Airport
ITV reality television shows
ITV documentaries